The 1993 Newfoundland general election was held on May 3, 1993, to elect members of the 42nd General Assembly of Newfoundland. It was won by the Liberal party.

Results

References
 Election Report

1993
Newfoundland general election
General election
Newfoundland general election